The New Agriculture Movement is an agricultural movement in Bangladesh that opposes the use of Western pesticides and genetically altered seeds.

The Movement began in response to environmental hazards that were believed to have been started by the use of insecticides and nematicides in the growing of crops.

In addition to health concerns the movement strongly promotes organic farming, and the use for food and animal fodder of plants which are often regarded as weeds. This is seen as both furthering self-sufficiency and distancing Bangladesh from Western development firms and the International Monetary Fund.

Nayakrishi has a special emphasis on supporting women, with a programme of supplying cattle to poor female-headed households which are kept until a calf is born, when the original animal is passed on to another family, and the organisation of the Specialised Women's Seed Network to collect seeds from local varieties of crops.

See also 
	
 Conservation biology
 Conservation ethic
 Conservation movement
 Ecology
 Ecology movement
 Environmentalism
 Environmental movement
 Environmental protection
 Habitat conservation
 List of environmental organizations
 Natural environment
 Natural capital
 Natural resource
 Polyculture
 Renewable resource
 Sustainable development
 Sustainability

References

Agricultural organisations based in Bangladesh
Environment of Bangladesh
Organic farming in Asia
Environmental organisations based in Bangladesh